Thomas Walsh born in Waterford, Ireland in 1580 - died in Santiago de Compostela, Spain in 1654; was an Irish prelate of the Roman Catholic Church. He served as the Archbishop of Cashel from 1626 to 1654.

He was appointed the archbishop of the Metropolitan see of Cashel on 27 April 1626 and consecrated in the Spanish Netherlands on 8 July 1626, After the siege of Limerick in 1651, the archbishop was compelled to go into exile. and ordained at Ordained Bishop	S. Isidore, Church, Rome.

Walsh died in exile on 5 May 1654. On 6 May 1654 he was buried with great ceremony in the Santiago de Compostela Cathedral next to the Chapel of the Kings and Relics.

References

Bibliography

 
 

1580 births
1654 deaths
17th-century Roman Catholic archbishops in Ireland
Roman Catholic archbishops of Cashel